Józef Kisielewski (26 January 1905 – 20 July 1966) was a Polish writer, journalist and right-wing politician of the National Party.

Kisielewski was born in Mostyska. He studied Polish Language at the Adam Mickiewicz University in Poznań. After graduation, in 1929, he worked as a secretary in a Roman Catholic weekly Przewodnik Katolicki, then, in 1931 became editor-in-chief of the Tecza monthly. Also, his articles were published in a right-wing weekly Prosto z mostu.

In the years 1937 and 1938 Kisielewski went on a series of trips across then-northern Germany, from Berlin, through Hanover, Hamburg, and Stettin to Leba. In the summer of 1939, soon before the outbreak of the Second World War, his book Ziemia Gromadzi Prochy (Earth Gathers the Ashes) was published. The book is a report of his trips, it critically analyzes everyday life of prewar Nazi Germany and accentuates Slavic past of large parts of Germany. Kisielewski was aware of the growing power of Nazi military machine, he correctly predicted that war would start soon. The book was banned by German occupiers of Poland, it was reprinted by Polish anti-Nazi resistance in 1943 and the publication was widely popular.

In September 1939 Jozef Kisielewski, who was well aware that the Germans wanted to capture and kill him for the book, escaped to Romania, then to France and Great Britain. Between 1946 and 1949 he published the Przegląd Polski weekly, then became director of the Roman Catholic Publishing House "Veritas". Also, he co-produced magazines Życie and Poland and Germany.

He married Irish art historian and former SOE officer, Erica O'Donnell, in 1958. They had two sons.

He died of a heart attack in Bandon, Ireland.

He is buried in Gunnersbury Cemetery, London.

References

 "Ocalona garstka popiołu - Pamięci Józefa Kisielewskiego." - 1966 "Dziennik Polski" Marian Czuchnowski
 "W kręgu przyjaźni" - A. Rogalski Warszawa 1983, s. 69-88
 "Wielkopolski Słownik Biograficzny" Krystyna Sroczyńska 1981

External links
 Short bio of Kisielewski, from an Internet Encyclopedia WIEM

1905 births
1966 deaths
Polish male writers
People from Mostyska
Polish emigrants to the United Kingdom
Polish exiles
Polish expatriates in France